is a railway station in Suruga-ku, Shizuoka, Shizuoka Prefecture, Japan, operated by the private railway company, Shizuoka Railway (Shizutetsu).

Lines
Kitsunegasaki Station is a station on the Shizuoka–Shimizu Line and is 8.3 kilometers from the starting point of the line at Shin-Shizuoka Station.

Station layout
The station has a single island platform. The station building is built above the west side of the platform, and has automated ticket machines, and automated turnstiles, which accept the LuLuCa smart card ticketing system as well as the PiTaPa and ICOCA IC cards. The station is wheelchair accessible.

Platforms

Adjacent stations

Station history
In 1926, the predecessor of the Kitsunegasaki Young Land Amusement Center opened, and in 1927 the Uehara Station was renamed . The amusement part closed during World War II, and in 1944, Yuenmae Station was renamed as Kitsunegasaki Station.

Passenger statistics
In fiscal 2017, the station was used by an average of 2657 passengers daily (boarding passengers only).

Surrounding area
Kitsunegasaki Young Land

See also
 List of railway stations in Japan

References

External links

 Shizuoka Railway official website

Railway stations in Shizuoka Prefecture
Railway stations in Japan opened in 1908
Railway stations in Shizuoka (city)